Laurence Boone (born 15 May 1969) is a French economist who has been serving as the Secretary of State for European affairs in the government of Prime Minister Élisabeth Borne since 2022.

Boone’s fields of interest include macroeconomics, European politics and public finance. She served as an economic advisor to President François Hollande between July 2014 and March 2016.

Early life and education 
Boone was born in 1969 in a family with distant Irish origins. Her father was an engineer. She attended the school institutions of Notre-Dame-de-Sion, La Bruyère-Sainte-Cécile and École du Sacré-Cœur.

Boone earned an MAS in modelization and quantitative analysis from Paris X-Nanterre University, a PhD in economics from London Business School, and a master's degree in econometrics from the University of Reading.

Career

Early beginnings
Boone started her career as an analyst at Merrill Lynch Asset Management (1995–6). She was a researcher at the Centre d'Etudes Prospectives et d'Informations Internationales (CEPII) from 1996 to 1998, then an economist at the department of Economic Affairs of the OECD from 1998 to 2004. In 2004, she joined Barclays Capital France as a chief economist.

In 2011, Boone became the Europe chief economist at Bank of America-Merrill Lynch. A member of the Cercle des économistes, Boone authored numerous books and publications. She taught at Sciences Po, École Polytechnique, ENSAE and ENS Cachan. She was also a member of the jury of the École nationale d'administration competitive exam.

In 2014, Boone started editing chronicles for the L'Opinion daily.

Career in politics
In July 2014, Boone was appointed a financial and economic advisor to the Élysée Palace. The announcement of her nomination to President François Hollande was made in early June 2014 as an anticipation of Emmanuel Macron's resignation. L'Opinion then highlighted one of her recent chronicles in which she criticized "disastrous economic results" and the government's "almost nonexistent choices of economic policy". The announcement of her nomination also sparked harsh comments, like the one of Slate's : "the world of finance that governs without ever having been elected" —which is a reference to François Hollande's January 22, 2012 speech in Le Bourget. Minister of Finance and the Public Accounts Michel Sapin replied: "Competences are back." The coincidence of the nomination and David Azéma being hired by Bank of America in July 2014 sparked comments about a "shameless revolving door between Bank of America and the socialist power".

On December 26, 2014, Boone's position was named "special advisor for multilateral and European economic and financial affairs", sherpa of François Hollande, as a part of a series of decisions made to "simplify" his cabinet. During the Greek government-debt crisis, she contributed to convince the French President to keep Greece in the Eurozone. She was also considered one of the most prominent European economists advocating for a serious democratic overhaul of the eurozone institutions.

Boone took part in the 2015 Bilderberg Conference.

Return to the private sector
Boone's resignation on March 14, 2016 to join AXA as a chief economist was announced in January of the same year. In this capacity, she worked under the leadership of the company's CEO Thomas Buberl.

OECD
On June 5, 2018, Boone was appointed as chief economist of the OECD, as a replacement to Catherine L. Mann. She took office on July 24, 2018, working under the leadership of secretary general José Ángel Gurría.

In June 2021, Boone was also appointed to the World Bank–International Monetary Fund High-Level Advisory Group (HLAG) on Sustainable and Inclusive Recovery and Growth, co-chaired by Mari Pangestu, Ceyla Pazarbasioglu, and Nicholas Stern.

In January 2022, Boone was appointed as Deputy Secretary-General of the OECD, serving alongside Kerri-Ann Jones and Ulrik Knudsen under secretary general Mathias Cormann.

Other activities

Corporate boards
 Kering, Member of the Board of Directors (2010–2014)

Non-profit organizations
 European Council on Foreign Relations (ECFR), Member of the Council
 Jacques Delors Centre, Hertie School, Member of the Advisory Board
 Cercle des économistes, Member

Personal life
Boone is married to Polytechnician Xavier Faure, and mother of two children.

References 

1969 births
Living people
French women economists
20th-century French  economists
21st-century French  economists
Paris Nanterre University alumni
Alumni of London Business School
Alumni of the University of Reading
Academic staff of the École Normale Supérieure
Academic staff of École Polytechnique
Academic staff of Sciences Po
Presidential advisors
François Hollande
Chevaliers of the Légion d'honneur
People from Boulogne-Billancourt
French people of Irish descent
Members of the Borne government
Women government ministers of France